Byron–Bergen Central School District is a school district in Bergen, New York. Mr. Patrick McGee is the superintendent. The district operates two schools: Byron-Bergen Junior-Senior High School and Byron-Bergen Elementary School. The Roman attends.

History 
Founded in 1955, it is the combination of two school districts in Byron and Bergen, small towns in western New York State.  The District encompasses 77 square miles in a rural, agricultural area.

Selected former superintendents 
Previous assignment and reason for departure denoted within parentheses
George A. Barber
William A. Stirling
John Hadden [interim]–1968-1969
Thomas Colamoncio–1969-1970
William Hayes–1970-?
J. Dennis Kirst–1995-2001
Gregory C. Geer–2001–2009 (Principal - East Irondequoit Middle School, retired)
Scott G. Martzloff–2009–2011 (Assistant Principal for Operations - Edison Technology High School, named Superintendent of Williamsville Central School District)
Loren Penman (interim)–2011-2012 (Director of Learning - Byron–Bergen Central School District, retired)
Casey Kosiorek–2012-2016 (Principal - Wolcott Street Elementary School, named Superintendent of Hilton Central School District)
Jon Hunter (interim)–2016 (Superintendent - Fairport Central School District, named Interim Superintendent of West Irondequoit Central School District)
Mickey Edwards–2016-2021 (Superintendent - Wyoming Central School, named Superintendent of Albion Central School District)
Scott Bischoping (interim)–2021 (Interim Superintendent - Albion Central School District, named Interim Superintendent of Batavia City School District)

Byron-Bergen Junior-Senior High School 

Byron-Bergen Junior-Senior High School is located at 6917 West Bergen Road and serves grades 6 through 12. The current principal is Mr. Ashley John Grillo.

History 
Byron-Bergen operated a middle school from 2003 to 2012, when it reconsolidated with the high school for budget reasons.

Selected Former Principals 
Previous assignment and reason for departure denoted within parentheses
LeRoy G. Merriam
Norman J. Hill
John F. Hadden–?-1968 (unknown, named Acting District Principal of Byron–Bergen Central School District)
Udo Treiber–1968-1969 (Principal - Byron-Bergen Elementary School, returned to position)
William Hayes–1969-1978 (unknown, named Superintendent of Byron–Bergen Central School District)
Frank C. Ferrando–1978-1988 (Assistant Principal - Batavia High School, named Assistant Superintendent for Secondary Education of Grand Island Central School District)
Edward F. Bishop–1988-2000 (Vice Principal - Waterloo High School, retired)
Norman Fagnan–2000–2001
Donna Schalge–2001–2003
Frank Del Favero–2003-2004
David R. Pescrillo–2004–2009 (Assistant Principal/Athletic Director - East Irondequoit High School, retired)
Aaron Johnson–2009-2015 (Assistant Principal - Gates Chili High School, named Superintendent of Avon Central School District)
Patrick McGee–2015-2021 (Assistant Principal - Byron-Bergen Junior-Senior High School, named Superintendent of Byron–Bergen Central School District)

Byron-Bergen Elementary School 

Byron-Bergen Elementary School is located at 6917 West Bergen Road and serves grades PreK through 5. The current principal is Brian Meister.

Western New York Tech Academy

References

External links
Official site

Education in Genesee County, New York
School districts in New York (state)
School districts established in 1955